The White Rose Classic was a golf tournament on the Nike Tour. It was only played in 1993. It was played at Honey Run Golf & Country Club in York, Pennsylvania.

Curt Byrum received $36,000.

Winners

Former Korn Ferry Tour events
Golf in Pennsylvania
1993 establishments in Pennsylvania
1993 disestablishments in Pennsylvania